Lumme may refer to:

 Antero Lumme (1934–2016), Finnish racing cyclist
 Jyrki Lumme (born 1966), Finnish ice hockey player
 Sonja Lumme (born 1961), Finnish singer
 Timo Lumme (born 1961), Finnish Managing Director of the IOC television and Marketing Services of the International Olympic Committee (IOC)

Others
 2600 Lumme, a minor planet

See also
 Lum (disambiguation)
 Lummer (disambiguation)